Gidesi Chalamanda was born on 15 January 1931, is most commonly known as "Agide". He is a Malawian acoustic artist. He was born in Chiradzulu in the Southern region of Malawi.

He is one of Malawi's legendary artists. His song "linny" a mashup with Dr Namadingo trended on Tiktok gaining over a million views and challenges across the world. Maso Awards will on 26th November, 2022 award the legendary musician a "Lifetime achievement award" for his contribution towards the development of the music industry in Malawi as announced through the Maso Awards' Facebook page.

2016 Coming To America tour
In the lyrics to his song "Buffalo soldier", he mentions that if he had enough money he would travel to America. In 2016, with the help of fans, friends and Malawian organizations both in Malawi and in the Malawian Diaspora, he was able to achieve this dream when he traveled to the US with musicians Davis ndi Edgar. He held a concert at the Black Rock Center for the Arts in the "Pulse of Malawi" concert  which celebrated Malawian independence day in Germantown MD. He was a panelist at the panel discussions held by the Malawian Diaspora organizations.  He also played at the Library of Congress in Washington D.C. where his music was archived. He also held a concert at the state theater in Indiana, a state mentioned in his original song.

2020 collaboration with Patience Namadingo 
In July 2020, Chalamanda collaborated with Malawian local gospel artiste Patience Namadingo who was the brand ambassador of Malawian private bank FDH Financial Holdings and together made a remix of a number of his hit songs including "Linnyhoo", "Buffalo Soldier", and "Che meri". In the remix video, Chalamanda is seen providing amazing bass vocals with Namadingo weaving his voice together with his, producing a hit song that has made rounds on social media platforms like Tiktok. In the same month, FDH promised to build Chalamanda a grocery store in his local town of Chiradzulu. The promise was fulfilled in September of the same year when the bank handed over a well constructed and fully stocked grocery store, thereby providing Chalamanda with a reliable source of income to facilitate his retirement from music.

References

21st-century Malawian male singers
1930 births
Living people
20th-century Malawian male singers